Xinghuacun is a town in Fenyang, Shanxi Province, China. , it administers Fenjiu Residential Community and the following ten villages:
Dongbao Village
Xibao Village
Fenghaogou Village
Anshang Village
Xiaoxiang Village
Shangbao Village
Xiabao Village
Xiaoxiangzhai Village
Xinghuacun New Village
Wujiayuan Village

References

Fenyang
Township-level divisions of Shanxi